The 2019 Cape Verdean Football Championships is the 40th season of the Cape Verdean Football Championships, the top-tier football league in Cape Verde.

Overview
A total of 12 clubs participate in the national championship (Campeonato Nacional). Cape Verdean clubs in the nine inhabited islands will play between late 2017 and early 2018 in the eleven regional leagues, where each league winner qualify for the national championship. The defending champions also qualify, and if they win their regional league, the runner-up of their league also qualifies.

Teams

Group stage
Group winners and best runners-up advance to semi-finals

Group A

Group B

Group C

Knockout stage

Final clubs' stadiums

References

Cape Verdean Football Championship seasons
1
Cape Verde